John Mogford (1821– 2 November 1885) was an English landscape painter.

Life

Mogford's background was in Devon. He studied at the Somerset House Government School of Design, and then exhibited at the Royal Academy, British Institution and Suffolk Street Gallery. He lived in Hampstead, and became a member of the Institute of Painters in Watercolours, where he was known for his Cornish landscapes.

Mogford taught at the Maddox Street art school, where his pupils included Emily Mary Osborn. He married a daughter of Francis Danby.

He died on the 2nd November 1885 and was buried on the eastern side of Highgate Cemetery.

Notes

External links

 

1821 births
1885 deaths
Burials at Highgate Cemetery
19th-century English painters
English landscape painters
English male painters
English watercolourists
Landscape artists
Members of the Royal Institute of Painters in Water Colours
19th-century English male artists